Governor Denham may refer to:

Dixon Denham (1786–1828), Governor of Sierra Leone in 1828
Edward Brandis Denham (1876–1938), Governor of the Gambia from 1928 to 1930, Governor of British Guiana from 1930 to 1935, and Governor of Jamaica from 1935 to 1938